Qatar is a sovereign country located in Western Asia, occupying the small Qatar Peninsula on the northeastern coast of the Arabian Peninsula. Oil was discovered in Qatar in 1940, in Dukhan Field. The discovery transformed the state's economy. Now, the country has a high standard of living for its legal citizens. With no income tax, Qatar (along with Bahrain and the UAE) is one of the countries with the lowest tax rates in the world. The unemployment rate in June 2013 was 0.1%.  Corporate law mandates that Qatari nationals must hold 51% of any venture in the Emirate. In January 2018 a new draft law was approved by the Council of Ministers that would allow 100 percent foreign investment in all economic and commercial activities and sectors to  help foreign capital inflow.

Notable firms 
This list includes notable companies with primary headquarters located in the country. The industry and sector follow the Industry Classification Benchmark taxonomy. Organizations which have ceased operations are included and noted as defunct.

See also 
 List of airlines of Qatar
 Economy of Qatar
 Qatar Stock Exchange

References

Qatar
Companies of Qatar